Mood to Be Wooed is a 1958 studio album by Sammy Davis Jr. and featuring Mundell Lowe on electric guitar.

Reception

Bruce Eder of AllMusic gave this album three and a half stars out of five. He was critical of Davis' low-key performance but stated, "the singing in a reflective, almost introspective manner is good enough to carry the entertainment load."

Track listing 
 "What Is There to Say?" (Vernon Duke, E. Y. "Yip" Harburg) - 3:41
 "Why Shouldn't I?" (Moss Hart, Cole Porter) - 4:01
 "Love Me" (Ned Washington, Victor Young) - 3:18
 "Bewitched" (Richard Rodgers, Lorenz Hart) - 4:27
 "I Could Have Told You" (Jimmy Van Heusen, Carl Sigman) - 3:55
 "For All We Know" (J. Fred Coots, Sam M. Lewis) - 3:53
 "Deep in a Dream" (Van Heusen, Eddie DeLange) - 4:05
 "I Get Along Without You Very Well" (Hoagy Carmichael, Jane Brown Thompson) - 3:28
 "Mam'selle" (Edmund Goulding, Mack Gordon) - 2:46
 "Try a Little Tenderness" (Jimmy Campbell, Reg Connelly, Harry M. Woods) - 4:11
 "This Love of Mine" (Frank Sinatra, Henry Sanicola, Sol Parker) - 3:31
 "I've Got a Crush on You" (George Gershwin, Ira Gershwin) - 3:01

Personnel 
 Sammy Davis Jr. – vocals
 Mundell Lowe - electric guitar

References 

1958 albums
Sammy Davis Jr. albums
Decca Records albums